The Ourense Torcs are a pair of Iron Age gold torc neck rings found near Ourense in Northwest Spain in the 1950s. They were acquired by the British Museum in 1960.

Discovery
The exact find spot of the two neck rings has never been confirmed but experts have determined, based on the shape and design of the torcs, that they originate from Ourense in the province of Galicia near the Spanish/Portuguese border.

Description
The two gold torcs are nearly identical with double reel-shaped terminals and circular body. The terminals have a large tapered central depression, with embossed ornamentation around the edge. Their Celtic design is characteristic of the torcs produced in Galicia and northern Portugal, in the Iberian Peninsula.

See also
Castro Culture
Braganza Brooch
Cordoba Treasure

Gallery of Galician torcs

Bibliography
M. Lenerz-de Wilde, 'The Celts in Spain' in The Celtic World, London and New York, Routledge, 1995
I. Stead, Celtic Art, British Museum Press, 1996
Megaw Ruth and Vincent, Celtic Art: From Its Beginnings to the Book of Kells, 2001

References

Torcs
Ancient Celtic metalwork
Prehistoric objects in the British Museum
Gold objects
Ourense